Ali Osman Sönmez (1926 in Momchilgrad – 12 October 2001), Turkish politician and businessperson.

Life and career 
Ali Osman Sönmez, who was born in the town of Momchilgrad in Bulgaria in 1926, stayed in Greece for 7 years after completing his primary and secondary education. Sönmez, who came to Turkey in 1948, settled in İnegöl district. Sönmez, who worked as a civil servant for a while in the Tekel administration, later left his job at his own will and started his business life.

Ali Osman Sönmez was the President of the Bursa Chamber of Commerce and Industry, the Chairman of the Union of Chambers Council, the Chairman of the Sönmez Holding Board of Directors and the 20th Term Bursa Deputy. Sönmez, who died on Friday, October 12, 2001, was buried in the family cemetery in Bursa Amir Sultan Cemetery after the ceremonies held the next day.

Ali Osman Sönmez Foundation 
Ali Osman Sönmez Foundation is a foundation founded by industrialist businessman Ali Osman Sönmez. The Foundation only gives scholarships to students studying in the field of business administration. Scholarship candidates must be from Bursa or have completed their secondary education in Bursa.

References 

1926 births
Turkish philanthropists
Turkish industrialists
Turkish businesspeople
Deputies of Bursa
2001 deaths